Horst Kuttelwascher (6 October 1937 – 26 July 2016) was an Austrian rower. He competed at the 1960 Summer Olympics and the 1964 Summer Olympics. Helmuth Kuttelwascher, also a rower, is his brother. Together, they won a bronze medal at the inaugural 1962 World Rowing Championships in the coxless four event.

References

1937 births
2016 deaths
Austrian male rowers
Olympic rowers of Austria
Rowers at the 1960 Summer Olympics
Rowers at the 1964 Summer Olympics
World Rowing Championships medalists for Austria